The 2021 UNAF U-17 Tournament is the 17th edition of the UNAF U-17 Tournament. The tournament will take place in Algeria, from 18 to 24 January 2021.
This tournament serves as a qualification event for the Africa U-17 Cup of Nations. The champions will qualify for the 2021 Africa U-17 Cup of Nations.

Participants
Egypt and Morocco withdrew from the tournament. Morocco qualified automatically for the 2021 Africa U-17 Cup of Nations as hosts of the tournament.

Venues

Squads

Match officials

Referees
 Ibrahim Nour El-Din (Egypt)
 Amin Mohamed Omar (Egypt)
 (Ms) Shahenda Saad El-Maghrabi (Egypt)
 Mustapha Kech Chaf (Morocco)
 Karim Sabry (Morocco)

Assistant Referees
 Ahmed Hossam Taha (Egypt)
 Hany Abdelfattah (Egypt)
 Yahya Nouali  (Morocco)
 Abdessamad Abertoune (Morocco)

Tournament
<onlyinclude>

Matches
All times are local, CET (UTC+1).

Qualified teams for Africa U-17 Cup of Nations
The following four teams from CAF qualify for the 2021 Africa U-17 Cup of Nations.

1 Bold indicates champion for that year. Italic indicates host for that year.

Statistics

Goalscorers

References

External links
انعقاد الاجتماع الفني لدورة اتحاد شمال افريقيا تحت 17 عاما المؤهلة الى كاس امم افريقيا 2021 - UNAF official website
Tournoi UNAF U17 : Le Tirage au Sort Effectué - FAF official website
UNAF U17 : le tirage au sort effectué - CAF official website

2021 in African football
UNAF U-17 Tournament
UNAF U-17 Tournament